Timiryazev (masculine) or Timiryazeva (feminine) is a Turkic Russian last name. It may refer to:

People
 Arkady Timiryasev (1880-1955), Soviet physicist and philosopher, and son of Kliment Timiryazev
  (1837–1903), Russian specialist in statistics and brother of Kliment Timiryazev
 Kliment Timiryazev (1843–1920), Russian botanist and physiologist
  (1835–1906), Russian military officer and brother of Kliment Timiryazev
 Vasily Timiryazev (journalist) (1841–1912), Russian journalist and brother of Kliment Timiryazev
 Vasily Timiryazev (statesman) (1849–1919), Russian Minister of Trade and Industry in Pyotr Stolypin's Cabinet

Other uses
 Timiryazev (crater), a lunar crater named after Kliment Timiryazev
 Timiryazev, Azerbaijan
 Timiryazeva, the administrative center of Timiryazevskoye Rural Settlement, Maykopsky District, Russia
 Timiryazev District, North Kazakhstan Region, Kazakhstan
 , awarded by the Russian Academy of Sciences
 6082 Timiryazev, a minor planet
 Russian State Agricultural University (also known as the Timiryazev Academy), named after Kliment Timiryazev

See also
 Timiryazevo (disambiguation)
 Timiryazevsky (disambiguation)

Russian-language surnames